Rangersdorf is a town in the district of Spittal an der Drau in Carinthia, Austria.

Geography
Rangersdorf lies in the Möll valley between the Goldberg Group of mountains to the north and the Kreuzeck Group to the south.

References

Cities and towns in Spittal an der Drau District